NV is a collaborative studio album by Dragged into Sunlight and Gnaw Their Tongues, released on 13 November 2015 by Prosthetic Records. The music on NV is predominantly influenced by the album Streetcleaner by the British industrial metal band Godflesh, with Justin Broadrick, Godflesh's frontman, acting as producer for the album.

Track listing

Personnel 
Adapted from NV liner notes.
Musicians
 Dragged into Sunlight – instruments
 Maurice de Jong (as Mories) – instruments
Production and additional personnel
 Justin Broadrick – production
 Tom Dring – production
 Seldon Hunt – illustrations

Release history

References

External links 
 
 N.V. at Bandcamp

2015 albums
Gnaw Their Tongues albums
Dragged Into Sunlight albums
Prosthetic Records albums
Albums produced by Justin Broadrick